Peña Blanca is a census-designated place (CDP) in Sandoval County, New Mexico. As of the 2000 census, the CDP population was 661. It is part of the Albuquerque Metropolitan Statistical Area.

Peña Blanca's name is derived from the Spanish term for "white rock". Without the tilde, "pena blanca" means "white sorrow" or "white pain".

Geography
Peña Blanca is located at  (35.573078, -106.337361).

Demographics

As of the census of 2000, there were 661 people, 226 households, and 169 families residing in the CDP. The population density was 97.4 people per square mile (37.6/km). There were 262 housing units at an average density of 38.6 per square mile (14.9/km). The racial makeup of the CDP was 26.63% White, 0.91% African American, 5.60% Native American, 0.15% Pacific Islander, 63.24% from other races, and 3.48% from two or more races. Hispanic or Latino of any race were 79.43% of the population.

There were 226 households, out of which 38.5% had children under the age of 18 living with them, 54.4% were married couples living together, 10.2% had a female householder with no husband present, and 25.2% were non-families. 16.8% of all households were made up of individuals, and 7.5% had someone living alone who was 65 years of age or older. The average household size was 2.92 and the average family size was 3.33.

In the CDP, the population was spread out, with 29.7% under the age of 18, 10.4% from 18 to 24, 28.3% from 25 to 44, 21.9% from 45 to 64, and 9.7% who were 65 years of age or older. The median age was 33 years. For every 100 females there were 99.7 males. For every 100 females age 18 and over, there were 94.6 males.

The median income for a household in the CDP was $24,063, and the median income for a family was $28,214. Males had a median income of $19,732 versus $24,583 for females. The per capita income for the CDP was $15,401. About 25.3% of families and 27.0% of the population were below the poverty line, including 30.8% of those under age 18 and 13.0% of those age 65 or over.

Education
Peña Blanca in the Bernalillo Public Schools district, which operates Cochiti Elementary & Middle Schools in Peña Blanca, and Bernalillo High School.

Notable people 

 Joseph Montoya, politician
 Francine Irving Neff, 34th treasurer of the United States

References

Census-designated places in Sandoval County, New Mexico
Census-designated places in New Mexico
Albuquerque metropolitan area